Geir Elsebutangen (born 3 January 1964) is a Norwegian politician for the Conservative Party.

He has served as an elected member of Skien city council. In the 2013 election he was elected as a deputy representative to the Parliament of Norway from Telemark.

Since 2013 he works as the chief executive officer of Kragerø Energi.

References

1964 births
Living people
Politicians from Skien
Conservative Party (Norway) politicians
Deputy members of the Storting
Norwegian businesspeople